Dryopetalon is a genus of flowering plants belonging to the family Brassicaceae.

Its native range is Southern USA to Northern Mexico.

Species:

Dryopetalon auriculatum 
Dryopetalon breedlovei 
Dryopetalon byei 
Dryopetalon crenatum 
Dryopetalon membranifolium 
Dryopetalon palmeri 
Dryopetalon paysonii 
Dryopetalon runcinatum 
Dryopetalon stenocarpum

References

Brassicaceae
Brassicaceae genera